A statue of Alan Turing, created in slate by Stephen Kettle in 2007, is located at Bletchley Park in England as part of an exhibition that honours Turing (1912–1954). It was commissioned by the American businessman and philanthropist Sidney Frank (1919–2006).

The slate for the sculpture was selected from North Wales because the sculptor learned that Turing used to holiday there as a child and adult. The slate originated from Llechwedd, near Blaenau Ffestiniog. Turing is depicted seated and looking at a German Enigma machine. He is dressed in a jacket, but there is some deliberate untidiness in his clothing.

In 2007, it was commented that the statue acknowledges Turing as a codebreaker but not as a gay icon. The statue became part of a new exhibition at Bletchley Park on Alan Turing in 2012, the centenary year of Turing's birth. Sir John Dermot Turing, nephew of Alan Turing, attended the opening of the exhibition and posed with the statue.

See also
 2007 in art
 Alan Turing Memorial (2001), Manchester
 List of LGBT monuments and memorials

References

External links
 
 Alan Turing statue information from Stephen Kettle

2007 establishments in England
2007 sculptures
Statues in England
Stone sculptures
Cultural depictions of Alan Turing
Monuments and memorials in Buckinghamshire
Sculptures of men in the United Kingdom
LGBT monuments and memorials in Europe
Bletchley Park
Slate industry in Wales